Baltish is a black humour TV show produced by MTV Lietuva. It was aired from November 2007 to January 2008 by the music channels: MTV Lietuva, MTV Latvija and MTV Eesti. It is created by the Lithuanian entrepreneurs Algis Ramanauskas and Rimas Šapauskas, best known for their performances in the Radioshow, as well as other Lithuanian performers and stage actors. The conductor of the show is Polish-Lithuanian musician Karina Krysko.

Setting

The show takes place in the fictitious post-Soviet country Baltish that corresponds to the modern territories of Latvia, Lithuania and Estonia and reflects the worst sides of their societies: antisemitism, xenophobia, sexism, homophobia and sentiments to the Soviet past. The Baltish language is the one  known otherwise as the "broken English", i.e. the English language with heavy Eastern European accent and some ingredients of the Russian language. The name "Baltish" is a somewhat corrupt derivative from the geo-political term Baltic states.

Characters

The main character Budulis is a widely known Lithuanian archetype of violent, rude and uneducated provincial youngster inclined to criminal behaviour, created by Rimas Šapauskas in his earlier TV performances. He is discernible from a blackened mouth and a track suit worn on a permanent basis. This caricaturization has acquired a cult status in Lithuanian culture and "budulis" is sometimes used in place of a common noun defining that type of a person.

The red outfitted devil named Molotov von Ribbentrop is another popular character. His name is constructed from the surnames of Vyacheslav Molotov and Joachim von Ribbentrop, signatories of Molotov-Ribbentrop Pact, which secret protocol constituted a legal basis for the Occupation of Baltic states. The devil is hilarious due to its looks as it is being acted by a woman as well as for its odd speech. It is usually armed with a trident and has no penis, which is therefore replaced by a black strap-on dildo in several series.

Česlovas also acted by Rimas Šapauskas is another character familiar from earlier TV and radio projects, including Radioshow, Orbita and Ragai. He is discernible from curly grey hair and wears glasses. He owns a cabaret which hosts funny performances and contests between representatives of the "Baltish regions" in which Lithuania sometimes prevails or there is no clear winner.

External links
 About the show 

Satirical television shows
MTV